Lilly Hartley is an American documentary film producer and actress, and the founder of Candescent Films.

Early life and education
Hartley was raised in East Hampton, New York and New York City. Her father is a playwright and graduate of the Yale School of Drama and her mother is a scientist. Her godfather, Ken Howard, was an actor and was president of the Screen Actors Guild. Her grandfather, Benjamin Epstein, worked with Martin Luther King Jr. and Robert F. Kennedy during the Civil Rights Movement in his role as national director of the Anti-Defamation League. She majored in history and English in college and graduated summa cum laude. She studied acting at William Esper Studio, completing the two-year program.

Career
Hartley founded Candescent Films in 2010. The film production company supports documentary films exploring social issues. Prior to founding the company, Hartley worked as an actress and production executive. She is a member of the Screen Actors Guild and Producers Guild of America.

The first film supported by Candescent was The Queen of Versailles, which was the opening night film at the 2012 Sundance Film Festival, and was nominated for a DGA Award, IDA Award and Critics' Choice Award. Hartley served as an executive producer. As a producer on Sons of the Clouds, a documentary exploring human rights issues in Western Sahara and starring Javier Bardem, Hartley won the 2013 Goya Award for Best Documentary Film. The film premiered at the 2012 Berlin International Film Festival, had its North American premiere at the Toronto International Film Festival, and was also screened at the United Nations in New York, the RFK Center for Justice and Human Rights in Washington, DC, and at the European Parliament in Brussels.

In 2012, Hartley's Candescent Films created the Candescent Award, providing grant money in support of socially conscious documentary films. The Candescent Award is an annual award given to projects supported by the Sundance Institute Documentary Film Program that premiere at the Sundance Film Festival. Past winners are Escape Fire: The Fight to Rescue American Healthcare (2012), Gideon's Army (2013), After Tiller (2013), Marmato (2014), Private Violence (2014), E-Team (2014), How to Change the World (2015), (T)error (2015) and City of Ghosts (2017), which was bought by Amazon. In 2014, Hartley partnered with the Tribeca Film Institute to develop a Candescent Award for films that premiere at the Tribeca Film Festival. The inaugural recipient of this award was Nas: Time Is Illmatic (2014). The second winner was The Yes Men Are Revolting, and the 2015 winner was The Wolfpack.

Some of Hartley's other work includes executive producing Who Is Dayani Cristal? starring Gael García Bernal, executive producing Private Violence, which premiered at the 2014 Sundance Film Festival, and producing Likeness, a short film starring Elle Fanning and directed by Rodrigo Prieto. Likeness premiered at the 2013 Tribeca Film Festival, and was nominated for a 2014 Webby Award for Drama: Long Form or Series. Hartley executive produced The Departure, directed by Lana Wilson, which premiered at the 2017 Tribeca Film Festival, and was nominated for the 2017 Independent Spirit Award for Best Documentary Feature. Hartley executive produced the big game hunting documentary Trophy, which premiered at the 2017 Sundance Film Festival, where it was acquired by CNN Films and The Orchard. Hartley executive produced Generation Wealth, which had its world premiere at the 2018 Sundance Film Festival, its European premiere at the Berlin International Film Festival, and was nominated for a 2018 Writers Guild of America Award for Best Documentary Screenplay.

Through Candescent Films, Hartley has also lent support to the documentaries Fed Up (produced and narrated by Katie Couric), Art and Craft, 3½ Minutes, Ten Bullets, Cartel Land, Racing Extinction, Solitary, Vegas Baby and Step. Art and Craft (2014) and 3½ Minutes, Ten Bullets (2015) were each shortlisted for the Academy Award for Best Documentary Feature.

Honors and awards
 Goya Award for Best Documentary Film, Sons of the Clouds, 2013
 Marie Claire's New Guard 50 Most Connected Women In America, 2014

Filmography

References

External links
 Candescent Films website
 

Living people
Year of birth missing (living people)
American documentary film producers
Actresses from New York City
Film producers from New York (state)
21st-century American actresses
American television actresses
American women documentary filmmakers